Aquamicrobium soli is a Gram-negative, aerobic, short rod-shaped non-spore-forming and non-motile bacteria from the genus of Aquamicrobium which has been isolated from soil which was contaminated with chlorobenzoate in China.

References

Phyllobacteriaceae
Bacteria described in 2017